Kiser is a variation spelling of the Germanic Kaiser surname, and is pronounced in the same manner as Kaiser. This spelling originated before  Standard German was codified, in territory that today falls within the mountainous Black Forest area of Germany and neighboring areas of Switzerland. The Kiser Family spelling is also common among current descendants living in the forested mountainous Appalachian mountains of North America. This surname may refer to:

 André Kiser (born 1958), A Swiss bobsledder who competed in the two man and the four man events at the 1988 Winter Olympics.
 Curtis Kiser (born 1944), politician.
 Earl Kiser (fl. 1900), bicycle racer.
 Garland Kiser (born 1968), baseball player.
 Holly Kiser (born 1986), blonde fashion model from Western Virginia.
 Jack Kiser (born 1949), football coach.
 Jackson L. Kiser (1929–2020), American judge
 Joseph L. Kiser (born 1933), former right-wing politician from Western North Carolina.
 John William Kiser (1857-1916), American businessman
 Micah Kiser (born 1995), American professional football player.
 Nate Kiser (born 1982), ice hockey player.
 Richard Kiser (born 1947), American guitar player from Virginia, awarded Gospel Instrumentalist of the Decade in 2009.
 Sherman L. Kiser (1889–1974), military officer.
 Terry Kiser (born 1939), actor, best known for playing the role of "Bernie" in the film Weekend at Bernie's.
The name also resounds in the Kiser-Moss building at UNCG, which was demolished in the early 2000s; and also Kiser Elementary School in Greensboro, North Carolina.

See also
 Kiser Lake, located in the State of Ohio, United States of America.
 Meyer-Kiser Building.